Elacholoma is a genus of flowering plants belonging to the family Phrymaceae.

Its native range is Central Australia.

Species:

Elacholoma hornii 
Elacholoma prostrata

References

Phrymaceae
Lamiales genera